WTSU (89.9 FM) is an American radio station licensed to serve Troy, Alabama and serving the Montgomery, Alabama market.  The station, established in 1977, is owned and operated by Troy University.  It broadcasts a classical music format as the flagship station of the Troy University Public Radio network.

WTSU broadcasts in HD.

History
WTSU started broadcasting on March 1, 1977, as the state's third public radio station (the callsign stands for the university's name then, "Troy State University," a part of the Alabama higher education system), and the first south of Birmingham. The station was assigned the call sign "WTSU" by the Federal Communications Commission (FCC). WTSU originally broadcast at 90.1 MHz with a power of 50,000 watts; by 1981, it moved to its present frequency of 89.9, doubling its wattage to 100,000.  Programming from the start was a blend of news and classical music, combined with an automated block of "beautiful music" between 9:00 a.m. and 4:00 p.m. Troy University Public Radio discontinued the easy-listening daytime format in 1993.

References

External links
Troy University Public Radio official website

TSU
NPR member stations
Classical music radio stations in the United States
Radio stations established in 1977
1977 establishments in Alabama